The Quiero Volver Tour was the second headlining concert tour by Argentinian singer and songwriter Tini, in support of her second studio album, Quiero Volver (2018), and later to promote her third studio album Tini Tini Tini (2020). It began on December 13, 2018, at the Estadio Luna Park in Buenos Aires, Argentina. The tour was projected to end on September 18, 2020, in Buenos Aires at the Movistar Arena, but due to the COVID-19 pandemic, it was interrupted earlier on March 9, 2020, in Utrecht, Netherlands.

Background 
In August 2018, during her performance at the charity event Un Sol Para los Chicos, the singer announced that the first show of the tour would be on December 1 of the same year at the Estadio Luna Park. Days before the concert, the show had to be rescheduled to December 13 due to the G20 event. The show sold out quickly and included special guests like Aitana, Ruggero Pasquarelli, and her frequent collaborators Cali y El Dandee.

Shortly after, the dates to visit Argentina and Latin American countries such as Chile, Uruguay, Paraguay, Mexico, Colombia and Peru were announced. At the end of 2019, the shows scheduled for Europe were announced, which included Germany, Switzerland, France, Italy, Spain, Belgium and the Netherlands, which were held at the beginning of 2020.

Commercial performance 
On June 27, 2020, the official figures for the tour were released through Hollywood Records, which also includes information on ticket sales as well as the general collection of the tour. It is estimated that more than 525,000 tickets have been sold, of which approximately 126,000 belong to festivals and free events. On the collection side, it is estimated at a total of more than $11,000,000. 

Tini achieved a record as the Argentine artist with the most sold-out tickets at Estadio Luna Park, performing a total of nine concerts, 8 of which were completely sold out.  The Argentine artist not only sold out the tickets for her presentations in Buenos Aires, but also had a great success in the rest of Latin America and Europe, with most of her concerts in the last destination completely sold out, with more than 22,000 sold out tickets in just one month.

Setlist 
This set list is from the concert on March 4, 2020, in Paris, France. It is not intended to represent all tour dates.

Act 1
"Princesa"
"Ya No Hay Nadie Que Nos Pare"
"Fresa"
"Respirar"
Act 2
 "Lights Down Low" (Latin Mix / Interlude)
"Finders Keepers"
"Si Tu Te Vas"
"Great Escape"
Act 3
 "Lucha Por Tus Sueños"
"Diciembre"
"Cristina"
"Oye"
"Consejo de Amor"
"Por Que Te Vas"
Act 4
 "La Cintura" (Remix / Interlude)
"Suéltate El Pelo"
"Quiero Volver"
"Recuerdo"
"22"
"Te Quiero Más"

Tour dates

Cancelled shows

References

2018 concert tours
2019 concert tours
2020 concert tours
Martina Stoessel concert tours
Concert tours of South America
Concert tours of Europe
Concert tours cancelled due to the COVID-19 pandemic